Cynthia Scheider (born Cynthia Bebout) is an American film editor active from the 1970s through the 1990s. She was once married to actor Roy Scheider.

Selected filmography 
 Mixing Nia (1999)
 Other Voices, Other Rooms (1995)
 *batteries not included (1987)
 The Men's Club (1986)
 The Legend of Billie Jean (1985)
 Without a Trace (1983)
 Eyewitness (1981)
 Chilly Scenes of Winter (1979)
 Breaking Away (1979)
 Sorcerer (1977)
 The Missouri Breaks (1976)
 The Happy Hooker (1975)
 The Taking of Pelham One Two Three (1974)
 Shoot It Black, Shoot It Blue (1974)
 The Seven-Ups (1973)

References

External links 

 

American women film editors
Year of birth missing (living people)
Living people
American film editors
21st-century American women